is a headland on  southernmost point on the Izu Peninsula on the island of Honshu in Japan. It is located within the borders of the town of Minamiizu, Shizuoka and is within the borders of the Fuji-Hakone-Izu National Park. The cape marks the border between Sagami Bay and Suruga Bay and also between the Philippine Sea and the Pacific Ocean.

Irōzaki Lighthouse stands on the cape. The cape also contains a  Shinto shrine, the Imuro Jinja, which claims to have been founded in the Nara period.

Climate

References

External links

Japan Travel Guide
Japan National Travel Organization (JNTO)

Minamiizu, Shizuoka
Landforms of Shizuoka Prefecture
Tourist attractions in Shizuoka Prefecture
Irozaki